Henry Shields (born 21 August 1988) is an English playwright and actor. Shields grew up in Hastings and his family still live there. He initially studied nursing at university but dropped out after a year and auditioned for drama school, gaining a place at LAMDA. It was while there that he met the collaborators with whom he would go on to form Mischief Theatre company. He is best known for starring in the plays The Play That Goes Wrong, Peter Pan Goes Wrong, and The Comedy About a Bank Robbery, which he also co-wrote along with Henry Lewis and Jonathan Sayer, as well as the TV adaptation The Goes Wrong Show. He has been nominated for three Olivier Awards for Best New Comedy, winning in 2015 for The Play That Goes Wrong.

Awards and nominations

References 

English male stage actors
Living people
1988 births
English male television actors
English male dramatists and playwrights
21st-century English male writers
21st-century British dramatists and playwrights
21st-century English male actors
People from Hastings
Alumni of the London Academy of Music and Dramatic Art
People educated at Cranbrook School, Kent